Discovery Channel Finland is a television channel targeting Finland owned by Discovery Networks. It has programming similar to its U.S. counterpart, the Discovery Channel.

It was launched on September 1, 2007, replacing a former pan-Nordic version of the Discovery Channel. On the same day, the analogue terrestrial transmitters were shut down and a new digital network containing, among other, Discovery Channel Finland was launched. In the terrestrial network it is a part of both the Canal Digital and PlusTV packages.

The pan-Nordic version of the Discovery Channel had carried subtitles in Swedish, Finnish, Norwegian and Danish. The new channel only contains Finnish subtitles.

References

Discovery Channel
Television channels in Finland
Television channels and stations established in 2007
Warner Bros. Discovery EMEA